Immortal Song may refer to:

Immortal Song (film), a 1952 Egyptian film
Immortal Songs, a South Korean television music competition
Immortal Songs: Singing the Legend, a South Korean television music competition